= Vishvamanava =

Vishvamanava (Sanskrit: विश्वमानव, romanized: Viśvamānava) refers to the Hindu philosophical concept of a universal man. It has been discussed by a number of significant philosophers such as Rabindranath Tagore.
